Microhyla pulchra is a species of narrow-mouthed frog found in northeastern India, southern China, and Southeast Asia south to at least Thailand but possibly as far south as Malaysia and Singapore. It has also been introduced to Guam.

It has many common names, including beautiful pygmy frog, Guangdong rice frog, and marbled pygmy frog. Microhyla pulchra is a common species in suitable habitat, but it is not often seen because it is cryptic and seasonal. It typically occurs near forest edges. It is eaten in Laos.

References

pulchra
Amphibians of Cambodia
Amphibians of China
Fauna of Hong Kong
Frogs of India
Amphibians of Laos
Amphibians of Thailand
Amphibians of Vietnam
Amphibians described in 1861